The 2005–06 Crown Prince Cup was the 31st season of the Saudi premier knockout tournament since its establishment in 1957. It started with the qualifying rounds on 24 November 2005 and concluded with the final on 7 April 2006.

Al-Hilal were the defending champions, having won the trophy in 2005, and won their second consecutive title, defeating Al-Ahli in the final on 7 April 2006. As winners of the tournament, Al-Hilal qualified for the 2007 AFC Champions League group stage.

Qualifying rounds
All of the competing teams that are not members of the Premier League competed in the qualifying rounds to secure one of 4 available places in the Round of 16. The qualifying competition began on 24 November 2005. First Division sides Al-Faisaly and Al-Riyadh, Second Division side Al-Hamadah and Third Division side Al-Rawdhah qualified.

First round

Second round

Final round

Bracket

Source: Al Jazirah

Round of 16
The Round of 16 fixtures were played on 27 and 28 December 2005. All times are local, AST (UTC+3).

Quarter-finals
The quarter-finals fixtures were played on 1 and 2 January 2006. All times are local, AST (UTC+3).

Semi-finals
The semi-finals first legs were played on 1 and 2 February 2006 while the second legs were played on 5 and 6 February 2006. All times are local, AST (UTC+3).

|}

Matches

Al-Ahli won 5–4 on aggregate.

Al-Hilal won 5–2 on aggregate.

Final

The final was held on 7 April 2006. All times are local, AST (UTC+3).

Top goalscorers
As of 7 April 2006

See also
 2005–06 Saudi Premier League
 2007 AFC Champions League

References

Saudi Crown Prince Cup seasons
2005–06 domestic association football cups
Crown Prince Cup